Carlo Dapporto (26 June 1911 – 1 October 1989) was an Italian film actor. He appeared in 35 films between 1944 and 1987. He was born in Sanremo, Italy and died in Rome, Italy.

Filmography

References

External links

1911 births
1989 deaths
People from Sanremo
Italian male film actors
20th-century Italian male actors
Ciak d'oro winners